Henricus was a settlement in colonial America.

Henricus may also refer to:

People
 Henricus (given name)
 Barney Henricus (1915–2007), Sri Lankan boxer and police officer, brother of Basil
 Basil Henricus (1922–2002), Sri Lankan boxer and army officer

Other uses
 Henricus (moth)